Juliette Louise B. Pochin (born 1971) is a Welsh classically trained mezzo-soprano singer, composer/arranger, and record producer. She is known not only for her performances in operas and as a classical recitalist as well as for her recordings of operatically styled crossover music. Morgan Pochin, the partnership which she formed with her husband James Morgan is known for their record productions for artists such as Katherine Jenkins and Alfie Boe, as well as their arrangements for film and television scores.

Biography and career
Born in Haverfordwest, Pochin attended the Royal Academy of Music (Junior Academy) and the Wells Cathedral School. She went on to read music at Trinity College, Cambridge as a choral scholar and also trained at the Guildhall School of Music and Drama. In 2005 she was signed by Sony BMG to record her debut album, Venezia, released in 2006 as Classic FM's "Record of the Week". Five months after the album's release, the British owned chocolatiers, Hotel Chocolat introduced a new chocolate range named for her, inspired by a description of her voice in The Times as "sounding like melted chocolate".

Pochin is married to the conductor and composer, James Morgan. The couple met at Cambridge University and first worked together composing for the Footlights. They went on to form Morgan Pochin Music Productions.

Morgan Pochin Music Productions
Morgan Pochin Music Productions is a UK-based company. Its founders James Morgan and Juliette Pochin produce recordings as well as composing original works and arranging music. They have composed and arranged music for several television shows including The Kumars at No. 42 as well as writing and producing Katherine Jenkins' debut album Premiere. The company also produced The King's Singers' album Swimming Over London, Pochin's solo album Venezia, Brian Knowles' Poetry Serenade, and Classic FM's Songs Without Words. Morgan and Pochin arranged the tracks "Lucrezia" (based on "Gia nel seno" from Handel's cantata La Lucrezia) and "Pace non trovo" (a vocal adaptation of Alessandro Marcello's Oboe Concerto) on Danielle De Niese's 2010 album, Diva. Their choral composition Kubla Khan had its world premiere at the 2002 Brighton Festival.

In 2010, Morgan Pochin adapted Mozart's music into a modern film score for a new British film based on his opera Così fan tutte. The film's working title is First Night and stars Richard E. Grant and Sarah Brightman. The film soundtrack album, arranged and produced by Morgan Pochin, was released on the Sony label in October 2011.

In 2010 Morgan Pochin produced Bring him Home, Alfie Boe's first album for Decca Records. In 2011, Morgan Pochin produced various tracks for Joe McElderry's second studio album Classic. The album reached number two in the UK charts on 3 September 2011. In late 2011 Morgan Pochin produced Alfie, their second album for Alfie Boe on Decca records. In 2012 Morgan Pochin produced the music for Dustin Hoffman's first film as director Quartet – starring Maggie Smith, Billy Connolly, Tom Courtenay and Michael Gambon.

Work was completed in early 2013 on "The Great Enormo – a Kerfuffle in B flat for orchestra, soprano and wasps"; music by James Morgan and Juliette Pochin, words by Michael Rosen. Commissioned by the Brighton Festival, it premiered on 4 May 2013 in the Brighton Dome for the opening of the festival. It featured Michael Rosen as narrator, James Morgan as conductor, Juliette Pochin as soprano and the City of London Sinfonia as the orchestra. It has since been performed with the City of Birmingham Symphony Orchestra at the Birmingham Symphony Hall, the Southbank Centre (Imagine Festival) and it has been translated into Portuguese for performances over there.

In mid-2013 Morgan Pochin produced, arranged and composed tracks for the album Wonderful World by Jack Topping. The album was released by Decca Records on 2 December 2013 and reached number 1 in the Classical Artists Chart on 14 December. Topping is the youngest solo artist to be signed by Decca Records. In conjunction with Parkinson's UK, Morgan Pochin arranged "Symfunny", a fundraising concert held in June 2014 at London's Royal Albert Hall.

Recordings

As performer
Venezia (selections from Vivaldi's sonnets sung to the music of his The Four Seasons). Label: Sony/BMG.
The Sky Shall Be Our Roof (rare songs from the operas of Ralph Vaughan Williams) – Sarah Fox (soprano), Juliette Pochin (mezzo-soprano), Andrew Staples (tenor), Roderick Williams (baritone), Iain Burnside (piano). Label: Albion Records
Poetry Serenade (English poems set by composer Brian Knowles) – Jon Christos (tenor), Nick Garrett (bass-baritone), Juliette Pochin (mezzo-soprano), Elin Manahan Thomas (soprano); City of Prague Philharmonic Orchestra, James Morgan (conductor). Label: Signum records.

As producer/arranger
Vera 100. Label: Decca
Songs Without Words. Label: Universal/Classic FM
Premiere – Katherine Jenkins. Label: UCJ
Bring Him Home – Alfie Boe. Label: Decca
Alfie – Alfie Boe. Label: Decca.
Classic – Joe McElderry. Label: Decca.
Classic Christmas – Joe McElderry. Label: Decca
Classic Rock. Label: Decca.
Songs Without Words – Label UCJ
Swimming over London – The Kings Singers – Label: Signum.
Venezia – Juliette Pochin.- Label: Sony.

References

External links
Juliette Pochin – The Domestic Diva (official website)
Morgan Pochin (official website)
Diary of a Domestic Diva blog (blog)
Morgan Pochin on Faber Music

Living people
Operatic mezzo-sopranos
21st-century British women opera singers
British record producers
British music arrangers
Alumni of Trinity College, Cambridge
Alumni of the Guildhall School of Music and Drama
People from Haverfordwest
1971 births
British women record producers